There is an abandoned Jai alai court in the back of the Hermanos Ameijeiras Hospital, the site of the old Casa de Beneficencia, on Calles Concordia and Lucenas near Calle Belascoain, an area that had been considered in the early part of the city as a place to locate the helpless and the unwanted (Casa de Beneficencia, Hospital de San Lázaro, the Espada Cemetery, Casa de Dementes de San Dionisio), it was the edge of the city and the countryside known as the "basurero"; the spectator stands were parallel to Calle Concordia, the front wall of the court faced Calle Lucenas, east in the direction towards Old Havana. The original building has been annexed by five stories of residential concrete construction on the north side along Calle Virtudes. The Havana Jai alai fronton was known as "the palace of screams" (Spanish: el palacio de los gritos).

 History 

In April 1898, the Mazzatini brothers made their first request to erect a building for Jai Alai and was approved, the Cuban War of Independence, however, delayed the process. In 1900 the Mazzatini brothers returned to the project, this time they received all the facilities from the municipal government, leaving the final approval of said approval in the hands of Colonel of the North American Army of intervention Dudley. The Havana Jai Alai Fronton, promoted by the Mazzantini brothers, was inaugurated in 1901 through their lawyer Basilio Sarasqueta with the support of Spanish fans.  The military man refused up to 3 times, stating that it was impossible for him to sign a ten-year contract that would assign civil government land for private use.
 On March 3, 1901, the Jai Alai frontón was inaugurated on a plot of land bounded by the Calles Concordia y Lucena.

"El Palacio de los Gritos"
Was the name by which the fans, and the rest of the population of Havana, knew the fronton of Jai-Alai, on the other hand, the players called it "El Matadero" (the killing field), because of how extreme it was to play there; the level and pressure were so high that for years it was considered the center of Basque pelota in America.

The term Jai Alai to refer to Basque pelota is attributed to Pío Baroja, who, when watching a game, called it "Jai Alai" (happy game in Basque). On the other hand, the term "Palacio de los Gritos" is attributed to Víctor Muñoz, a journalist of the time who Spanishized numerous terms in American and European sports. The interest in attracting new bettors was efficient and the Palace of Screams became even more hysterical, the players tried to listen to their personal bettors, those close to the track yelling at them where to shoot to fool their rivals. Of course, everyone yelled at his own, and at the bettors who went from one side of the stands to the other, making it impossible to understand the tactical instructions.

Society

Among the visitors is Ernest Hemingway, some photos attest to this, who made a great friendship with Guillermo Amuchastegui, the Ondarroa phenomenon, who became a regular in Havana who made a great friendship with Guillermo Amuchastegui, the Ondarroa phenomenon, who became a regular in Havana's high society of the time. It was not uncommon to see a multitude of ladies of the time go to the fronton with their best clothes.
Another fan of the Palace of Screams was Babe Ruth who according to the gossips left about $10,000 in gambling and an injury for trying to play the "fastest sport in the world" as the press called the top basket.

The Basques

The Basques exported the game from ca. 1800 to all parts of the world including the Americas. Jai alai (/ˈhaɪ.əlaɪ/: [ˈxai aˈlai]) is normally played with a ball that is bounced off of the floor and three walls accelerated to high speeds with a wicker hand-held device called a (Cesta). A sport played in Spain, southwest of France and Latin American countries, it is a variation of Basque pelota, a term, coined by Serafin Baroja in 1875, is also often loosely applied to the fronton (the open-walled playing area) where the sport is played. The game is called "zesta-punta" (basket tip) in Basque.

 Rules and customs 

The court for jai alai consists of walls on the front, back and left, and the floor between them. If the ball (called a pelota in Spanish, pilota in Standard Basque) touches the floor outside these walls, it is considered out of bounds. Similarly, there is also a border on the lower  of the front wall that is also out of bounds. The ceiling on the court is usually very high, so the ball has a more predictable path. The court is divided by 14 parallel lines going horizontally across the court, with line 1 closest to the front wall and line 14 the back wall. In doubles, each team consists of a frontcourt player and a backcourt player. The game begins when the frontcourt player of the first team serves the ball to the second team. The winner of each point stays on the court to meet the next team in rotation. Losers go to the end of the line to await another turn on the court. The first team to score 7 points (or 9 in Superfecta games) wins. The next highest scores are awarded "place" (second) and "show" (third) positions, respectively. Playoffs decide tied scores.

Round robin

A jai alai game is played in round robin format, usually between eight teams of two players each or eight single players. The first team to score 7 or 9 points wins the game. Two of the eight teams are in the court for each point. The server on one team must bounce the ball behind the serving line, then with the cesta "basket" hurl it towards the front wall so it bounces from there to between lines 4 and 7 on the floor. The ball is then in play. The ball used in jai alai is hand crafted and consists of metal strands tightly wound together and then wrapped in goat skin. Teams alternate catching the ball in their (also hand crafted) cesta and throwing it "in one fluid motion" without holding or juggling it. The ball must be caught either on the fly or after bouncing once on the floor. A team scores a point if an opposing player:
 fails to serve the ball directly to the front wall so that upon rebound it will bounce between lines No. 4 and 7. If it does not, it is an under or over serve and the other team will receive the point.
 fails to catch the ball on the fly or after one bounce
 holds or juggles the ball
 hurls the ball out of bounds
 interferes with a player attempting to catch and hurl the ball

The team scoring a point remains in the court and the opposing team rotates off the court to the end of the list of opponents. Points usually double after the first round of play, once each team has played at least one point. When a game is played with points doubling after the first round, this is called "Spectacular Seven" scoring.

The players frequently attempt a "chula" shot, where the ball is played off the front wall very high, then reaches the bottom of the back wall by the end of its arc. The bounce off the bottom of the back wall can be very low, and the ball is very difficult to return in this situation.

Since there is no wall on the right side, all jai alai players must play right-handed (wear the cesta on their right hand), as the spin of a left-handed hurl would send the ball toward the open right side.

Chula shot
The players frequently attempt a "chula" shot, where the ball is played off the front wall very high, then reaches the bottom of the back wall by the end of its arc. The bounce off the bottom of the back wall can be very low, and the ball is very difficult to return in this situation.

Since there is no wall on the right side, all jai alai players must play right-handed (wear the Cesta on their right hand), as the spin of a left-handed hurl would send the ball toward the open right side.

The fastest sport
The Basque government promotes jai alai'' as "the fastest sport in the world" because of the speed of the ball.
The sport can be dangerous, as the ball travels at high velocities. It has led to injuries that caused players to retire and fatalities have been recorded in some cases.

The building today
Carlos Martínez, a music producer and a neighbor who has the keys to the fronton states that: "between 1930 and 1950, this Havana Jai Alai court was perhaps the most important fronton in the world."

Gallery

See also

Barrio de San Lázaro, Havana
La Casa de Beneficencia y Maternidad de La Habana
Hospital de San Lázaro, Havana
Espada Cemetery
Havana Plan Piloto
Timeline of Havana

Notes

References

External links
Promocional Belascoain.f4v
Construcción para la Ciudad de La Habana
Calle Belascoain
BELASCOAIN - (vídeo musical)
CALLE SAN LAZARO CENTRO HABANA
Ruinas de la calle San Lázaro, Ctro.Habana. Ruins of San Lázaro Street.
 SAN LÁZARO 🇨🇺 LA CALLE MÁS DESTRUIDA DE LA HABANA
 La Casa de Beneficencia de la Habana.
 JAI ALAI - HABANA ‘El Palacio de los Gritos’

Buildings and structures in Havana
Neoclassical architecture in Cuba
History of Havana
20th century in Havana
1901 establishments in Cuba
Organizations established in 1901
Organizations disestablished in 1959
Sport in Havana
20th century in Cuba
1950 in Cuba
Architecture in Havana
20th-century architecture in Cuba